Zayante Creek (Ohlone: Sayant) is a  stream within the San Lorenzo River watershed in Santa Cruz County, California, United States. The U.S. government has designated Zayante Creek as impaired with respect to sediment. Lompico Creek, a tributary of Zayante Creek, is listed for impairment by pathogens. In the period 1998 to 2000 a restoration project was conducted for this stream to improve anadromous fish passage, rearing and spawning. Significant tributaries to Zayante Creek are Lompico Creek and Bean Creek.

Geology
Soils formations along the mainstem of Zayante Creek by ascending altitude are: Monterey Formation, Zayante Formation, Vaqueros Sandstone and Lompico Sandstone; about midway through its course, Zayante Creek is bisected by the Zayante Fault.

Ecology
Several notable ecological features are present in the Zayante Creek watershed, including the occurrence of a rare forest type: maritime coast range ponderosa pine forest, which contains two endangered arthropods.  Regarding specific avafauna species there are sightings of Townsend's warbler.

See also
List of rivers in California

References

Rivers of Santa Cruz County, California
Rivers of Northern California
Tributaries of the San Lorenzo River